Biz Kids (stylized as biz KID$) is an American educational television series that teaches financial education and entrepreneurship to kids and teenagers. It uses sketch comedy, musical guests, guest and special guest appearances, and young actors to explain basic economic concepts. Similar in format to CBC Television's Street Cents.  Its motto is: "Where kids teach kids about money and business." Biz Kid$ has been described as comparable to KING-TV's Almost Live!.

Production
Biz Kids was created by the producers of Bill Nye the Science Guy, the Emmy Award winning science show from the 1990s. Comedy sketches, spoofs of old TV shows and movies, commercial parodies, and silly antics are performed by a cast of Seattle teenage actors. The specials of Biz Kids are taking hours or minutes, instead of a typical show, with short sketches, the short, medium or longer sketches.

Cast 
The Biz Kids cast is made up largely of teenage actors from the Seattle area. Writer John Keister also has small recurring roles.

Biz Kids is about a group of high school teenagers and one middle school preteen teaches kids about money and others and they also been friends since childhood.

The original cast members were Lauren Dupree, Kaelon Horst, Bob Jones, Maia Lee, Alexander Oki, Amanda Powers, Miriam Schwartz, Austin Siedentopf, Devon Stark, Christina Taylor, and Elizabeth Wright.

Hosts 
 Lauren (The Hip Hop Dancer), aka "The Popular Girl", a teenage girl who has her two childhood best pals Maia and Kaelon. She is a 17-year-old girl at Seattle Academy of Arts and Sciences, because she loves theater, dance, and music. She is the most popular girl and theater girl in Seattle with her popular friends. She is Austin's dreamy girlfriend. She had her popular attendance records when she was in preschool to kindergarten. She was voted "Miss Popularity", "Best Dressed", "Most Pretty Girl", "Best Popular Teen" and others when she was 14, 15, or 16 years old in her freshman, sophomore, or junior year of high school in 2004, 2005, or 2006. Her idols are Beyoncé, Scary Spice, Raven Symone, and more idols. She is the leader of her Theater Arts team at Seattle Academy of Arts & Sciences. She is Lizzie's adoptive older sister. From her senior year of high school in season 1 to her college days in season 5. The show ended when Lauren was 21 years old and she graduated from Howard University, By the sixth season she was a 30 something woman. She starred in a movie called Crossroads when she was a young child in middle school. Her parents got married. She is 17 years old in Season 1, 18 years old in Season 2, 19 years old in Season 3, 20 years old in Season 4, and 21 years old in Season 5.
 Kaelon (The Smooth and Suave Boy), aka, "The Jock/Popular Girl's Pal", Lauren's best male friend since childhood. He is a 17-year-old guy at South Kitsap High School where he loves to play basketball. He is smooth and suave, and he is Austin's adopted brother. He is a leader of The Biz Squad (a parody of The Mod Squad) with his childhood female friends Lauren and Maia. He had braces until later episodes. He appeared in episodes of the South Kitsap High School show Wolf Tracks. The show ended when Kaelon was 21 years old, and he graduated from the University of California, Los Angeles, He is a leader of the South Kitsap High School basketball team and later the University of California, Los Angeles basketball team. His idol are his idols. and By the sixth season he was a 30 something man. He married his wife in the future. He starred in the short film Driver's Ed when he was 15 years old from his sophomore year of high school. His parents got married. He is 17 years old in Season 1, 18 years old in Season 2, 19 years old in Season 3, 20 years old in Season 4, and 21 years old in Season 5.
 Maia (The Friend Lover), aka "The Popular Girl's Other Pal", Lauren's best female friend since childhood, the second youngest of the Biz Kid$. She is a 14-year-old girl at her high school where she loves shopping, music and friends. She's like a younger sister to Alex. Her idols are Marie Osmond, Selena Gomez, Sporty Spice, and more. She was wearing so many different flats that's better than her shoes. She got ended by the third season when Maia was 16. From her freshman year of high school in season 1 to her junior year in season 3. She starred as a young girl in the film Max Rules! when she was 12 years old in the seventh grade and as an orphan in a silent movie Brand Upon the Brain! when she was 13 in the eighth grade from her middle school days. Her parents got married. She is 14 years old in Season 1, 15 years old in Season 2, and 16 years old in Season 3.
 Alex (The Language Speaker), aka "The Smart Boy", He is a 17-year-old guy at Lakeside School where he is learning different languages. He's like an older brother to Maia. His idols are Donny Osmond, David Henrie, and more idols. He is Amanda's love interest. He is a leader of Alex's Angels (a parody of Charlie's Angels), with his female childhood friends Amanda, Miriam and Christina. The show ended when Alex was 21 years old, and he graduated from Yale University. From his junior year of school in season 1 to his college days in season 5. By the sixth season he was a 30 something man. He played baseball. He starred as Woody in a ReAct Theater production Six Degrees of Separation when he was just 16 years old. His parents got married. He is 17 years old in Season 1, 18 years old in Season 2, 19 years old in Season 3, 20 years old in Season 4, and 21 years old in Season 5.
 Amanda (The Attention Girl), aka "The Second Popular Girl", She is an 18-year-old girl at her high school when she is friendly and outgoing. She likes to pay attention. She is the oldest of Biz Kid$. Her idols are Britney Spears, Madonna, Baby Spice and more idols. She is one of Christina's childhood best friends. She is Alex's love interest and Austin's former girlfriend/ex-girlfriend. The show ended when Amanda was 22 years old, and she graduated from college. From her high school days in season 1 to her college days in season 5. She has her friends from her past when she was a little girl. Now she has her own friends. Her parents got married. She is 18 years old in Season 1, 19 years old in Season 2, 20 years old in Season 3, 21 years old in Season 4, and 22 years old in Season 5.
 Miriam (The Funny People Laugher), aka "The Funniest One", She is a 17-year-old girl at Roosevelt High School where she makes people laugh. Her idols are Cher, Posh Spice and more. She is one of Christina and Amanda's childhood best friends. She is also Lizzie’s best friend. She's like a sister to Alex and Maia. The show ended when Miriam was 21 years old, and she graduated from University of Minnesota. By the sixth season she was in her mid 20s. She married her friend Adam in Oregon in the future. She had her own comedy shows, funny shows and her smart times when she was a kid. From her high school years in season 1 to her college days in season 5. Her parents got married. She is a 17 years old in Season 1, 18 years old in Season 2, 19 years old in Season 3, 20 years old in Season 4, and 21 years old in Season 5.
 Austin (The Pranker Boy), aka "The Prankster", He is a 16-year-old guy at Issaquah High School where he enjoys teaching with kids and he played football. He is Alex's best friend/childhood best friend. His idols are Drake Bell, Zac Efron and more. He is Kaelon's adopted brother. He is Lauren's boyfriend and Amanda's former boyfriend/ex-boyfriend. The show ended when Austin was 20 years old, and he graduated from the University of Washington. From his sophomore years in high school in season 1 to his college days in season 5. He had his attending rules when he was a kid. His parents got married. He is 16 years old in Season 1, 17 years old in Season 2, 18 years old in Season 3, 19 years old in Season 4, and 20 years old in Season 5.
 Devon (The Tae Kwon Do Boy), aka "The Karate Biz Kid", He is a 12-year-old 7th grader at his middle school where he enjoys karate and taekwondo. He is the youngest of the Biz Kid$. His idols are Michael Jackson and more. He is Lauren and Lizzie's adoptive younger brother. The show ended when Devon was 16. From his middle school days in season 1 to his junior year of high school in season 5. He his friends from his childhood. He was having his kung fu trophy when he was a kid. His parents got married. He is 12 years old in Season 1, 13 years old in Season 2, 14 years old in Season 3, 15 years old in Season 4, and 16 years old in Season 5.
 Christina (The Perfectionist), aka "The Smartest Perfectionist", She is a teenage girl with her glasses from her school where she is the perfectionist. She is one of Amanda & Miriam's childhood best friends. Her idols are Ginger Spice and more. The show ended when she was a young adult, she lost a couple of pounds from her weight loss, her diet and exercises, and she graduated from college. She had her own daily exercises when she was from a little girl to her early mid and late teens. From her high school days in seasons 1 to 3 to her college days in seasons 4 and 5. She lost weight and her healthy diet plan is great for her. Her parents got married. From her teenage years to her college years.
 Lizzie (The Creative Girl), aka "The Clothing Designing Girl", She is a teenage girl from her high school who loves to make clothes, prom dresses and others. She is another one of Christina & Amanda's childhood best friends. She is also Miriam’s best friend. She is Lauren's adoptive younger sister. Her idols are Kyla Pratt, and more. She had her own fashion plan when she was younger. She is a leader of Get Lizzie Love! (a parody of Get Christie Love!) The show ended when she was a young adult and graduated from college. From her high school days in season 1 to her college days in season 5. She made clothing designs when she was little. Her parents got married. From her teenage years to her college years.

Guest stars 
Judith Levine, an author of Not Buying It!
Ace Young, an American Idol finalist
Richard Karn, Home Improvement star and the fourth host of Family Feud from 2002 to 2006.
Brie Larson, an actress who needs to wear her clothes in Hollywood, California.
Cymphonique Miller, an actress, singer, dancer, and rapper who makes Byou.
Tracey Conway, Steve Wilson, Nancy Guppy, and more of John Keister and Pat Cashman's former Almost Live! cast members.
Jeff Bezos, Amazon.com founder.

Sketches 
 All My Investments, a parody of the soap opera on ABC, All My Children. Featured in two episodes "Saving and Investing for Your Future" and "Bulls, Bears and Financial Markets".
 The No-Sale Zone, a parody of the television series The Twilight Zone. Featured in an episode "Sell, Sell, Sell (The Science of Sales)".
 Mr. Squeezya Card, a commercial parody of the Visa card. Featured in an episode "Using Your Credit-Crazy or Compelling?".
 As the Economy Turns and As the Budget Turns, both parodies of the CBS soap opera As the World Turns. Featured in two episodes.
 The Adventures of Compulsive and Compare Kid, Amanda and Miriam as two teenage girls named Compulsive and Compare Kid to look at the newest phone ever. Featured in an episode "How to Be a Smart Consumer".
 Banks of Our Lives, a parody of the soap opera on NBC, Days of Our Lives. Featured in an episode "Take it to the Bank!".
 Gus Greenback: Gumshoe Detective, a 16-year-old teenage detective named Gus Greenback (Austin Siedentopf) has all the money clues to his friends, a pretty popular rich girl named Darla Dollar (Miriam Schwartz) and his assistant Sergeant Sawbuck (Lauren DuPree) solving some entrepreneur files during the mid to late 1940s and early 1950s in Seattle.
 Tooth Fairy Tales, it follows a fairy named Tooth Fairy (Austin Siedentopf), who gives money to the fairy's friends in their beds and waved the wand with magical dust, so they put them to sleep.
 Film, television spoofs, and other comedy sketches are featured in some episodes.

Lost Sketches 

 Fairy Tale Money Tips, a sketch starring Snow White (Maia Lee), Cinderella (Amanda Powers), Aladdin's princess (Lauren DuPree) and other cast members played fairy tale characters who have money tips.
 Besties with Cash!, a sketch starring two best friends Stacey (Miriam Schwartz) and Jessica (Elizabeth Wright) who talks about fashion, beauty, money, schools, and other things with co-hosts Katie (Maia Lee), Stacey's younger sister, Debbie (Lauren DuPree), Jessica's older sister, Natalie (Christina Taylor), Darcy (Amanda Powers), and other cast members.
 Super Biz Kid$, a fictional superhero team like the Avengers and Justice League who battles villains and fights crime that makes the city of Seattle their way. The team leader Princess Glitter (Lauren DuPree), her team, Thunder Boy (Alexander Oki) and Lightning Girl (Maia Lee), two teenage superhero siblings, Destroyer Dude (Kaelon Horst), Kung Fu Boy (Devon Stark), Flammo Dude (Austin Siedentopf), Plant Girl (Amanda Powers), Pixie Dust Girl (Christina Taylor), Wind Girl (Miriam Schwartz), and Snow Girl (Elizabeth Wright) with the villains Dr. Andy, the Queen of Hounds, The Banker, and other villains. Other superheroes and supervillains are included.
 Seattle Money Beat, a talk show from Seattle where three co-hosts Melissa (Lauren DuPree), Kelly (Maia Lee), and Brian (Kaelon Horst), where they talk about dollars, coins, and all of the stuff, similar to Northwest Afternoon, with their co-hosts Jack (Alexander Oki), Nicholas (Austin Siedentopf), Sarah (Amanda Powers), Gretchen (Christina Taylor) and other co-hosts.
 Money Saver Films, a parody of educational films from the 1950s to the 1990s because they teach about money and other things. Films as such as Cash: What a Payday!, The Right Time to Make Money, and others.
 The Charlie, Trisha, and Lori Radio Show, a sketch starring teenage radio personalities Charlie Crowne (Kaelon Horst), Trisha Clint (Lauren DuPree), and their co-host, Lori Wainwright (Maia Lee), talks through topics like beauty, clothing, and others.
 How to Survive a Payday, a parody of the NBC soap opera How to Survive a Marriage.
 Boyz4+Girlz6, a teen pop band similar to Backstreet Boys, Spice Girls, All Saints and similar bands.
 The Lindsay Heinebart Show, a talk show sketch starring Lindsay Heinebart (Maia Lee), a parody of Cindi Rinehart, when she talks about money, fashion, makeup, accessories, electronics, and others, she has special guests.
 The What Keeps Me Booth, a sketch featuring everyone from the What Keeps Me Booth.
 Skiers Earn Interest, a sketch featuring a group of kid and teenage skiers skiing on Mount Rainier together and they learn about interest.
 The High Fiving Pretty Girls, a sketch features a group of excessively, young and old, popular, teenage girls with high self-esteem who "go out on the town" all over Seattle, with their friends.
 They Are The Kids, a parody of We Are the World.
 The Witches of Seattle, four teenage witches talking about money and other things, they also can cast spells like Powerful than a nerd, turn Claire into a bird!, Brilliant than a frog, turn Andy into a dog!, along with their monster friends.
 The Wrestledolphs!, a wrestling family with money and they are attacking them and whooping them, Papa and Mama Wrestledolph giving out money to their children with their referee.
 All My Investments: 60 Year Anniversary, the hostess looks back at All My Investments episodes from the past decades from the 1950s to 1990s.
 Better Eating Through Saving Money, Alex, Miriam and Maia playing three teenage siblings named Jerry, Nicolette, and Deborah, demonstrating their families and friends’ money recipes.
 Pop-culture references, from I Love Lucy and Gilligan's Island to Saved by the Bell to The Addams Family.
 Halloween Sketches, Biz Kid$ has so many Halloween sketches like:
 The Monster Biz Kids, Lauren is a witch who is casting spells, Austin is a werewolf, Kaelon is a vampire, Devon is a mummy, Maia is a teen zombie, Lizzie is Medusa, Amanda, Christina, and Miriam are teenage witchy sisters who are also casting spells, Alex is a teenage Frankenstein with a featured cast member as a teenage bride of Frankenstein, Claire is a ghoulish girl, and other cast members as monsters. 
 Zom-Biz Kids, the hosts and extras of Biz Kid$ as zombies, while Pat Cashman and John Keister are being scared by a zombie couple.
The Curse of Mercer Street, The Haunted Studio, and other Halloween sketches.
 Christmas Sketches, Biz Kid$ has many Christmas sketches.
 Holiday Sketches, Biz Kid$ has every sketch from New Year's Eve to Christmas.
 Biz Kid$ Halloween Special Sketches, it has every sketch from the Biz Kid$ dressed up as monsters such as witches, vampires, ghosts, werewolves, zombies, mummies, gorgons, fly monsters, sea monsters, vampire girls, mad scientists, Frankenstein's monsters, grim reapers and more monsters to The Biz Kid$ Family, a parody of The Addams Family, to other Halloween sketches.
 Pop Star Sketches, Biz Kid$ have pop stars sketches from the Backstreet Boys, Madonna, Spice Girls to All Saints and other pop stars.

Broadcasting
Biz Kids is produced in association with WXXI of Rochester, NY, is distributed by American Public Television in the United States, and started airing in the United States on January 6, 2008. By June 2008, the show was on 311 of the nation's 343 PBS stations in 50 states.

It airs on KCTS-TV and KBTC-TV in Seattle and Tacoma. By the launch of Season Two, Biz Kid$ was airing in all 50 states and was available to over 287 million people.

The show also aired in the United Kingdom on the Simply Money channel and also aired in Canada on the Knowledge Network.

Reruns of the show aired on KCPQ-TV, KING-TV, and KONG-TV until 2020. The reruns of the show airs on KZJO-TV from September 2021 to present. It currently aired on PBS stations in 50 states. The show is also syndicated in many US local stations that are not owned by PBS.

Curriculum
A free curriculum is available for download for use by teachers and parents to use in classrooms, afterschool programs and at home. Each episode has a specially designed curriculum with activities, reviews and tests, all of which comply with the National Endowment for Financial Education standards. Five core Biz Kid$ lesson plans are available in Spanish.

References

External links
 

Children's sketch comedy
2008 American television series debuts
2017 American television series endings
2000s American children's comedy television series
2010s American children's comedy television series
2000s American satirical television series
2010s American satirical television series
2000s American sketch comedy television series
2010s American sketch comedy television series
American children's education television series
English-language television shows
PBS Kids shows
PBS original programming
Television series about teenagers